Simone Gutt (born 1956) is a Belgian mathematician specializing in differential geometry. She is a professor of mathematics at the Université libre de Bruxelles.

Education and career
Gutt was born on 13 July 1956 in Uccle, near Brussels.

She was a researcher for the National Fund for Scientific Research from 1981 until 1991, and became a professor at the Université libre de Bruxelles in 1992.

Recognition
Gutt was the 1998 winner of the quadrennial Francois Deruyts Prize in geometry of the Royal Academies for Science and the Arts of Belgium. She was elected to the Royal Academy of Science, Letters and Fine Arts of Belgium in 2004.

References

External links
Home page

1956 births
Living people
Belgian mathematicians
Belgian women mathematicians
Academic staff of the Université libre de Bruxelles
Members of the Royal Academy of Belgium